The following lists events that happened during 1906 in the Kingdom of Belgium.

Incumbents
Monarch: Leopold II
Prime Minister: Paul de Smet de Naeyer

Events

 7 February – Murder of Jeanne Van Calck in Brussels.
 24 February – Chilean diplomat Ernesto Balmaceda Bello murdered in Brussels.
 10 April – Chief of the General Staff reports to Minister of War on confidential conversations held earlier in the year with the British military attaché regarding the landing of a British expeditionary force in the event of a German invasion.
 Belgian Olympic Committee founded, with Édouard de Laveleye as first president.
 22 April to 2 May – 16 Belgian athletes participate in the Intercalated Games in Athens, winning 6 medals.
 29 April – Belgium national football team play against Netherlands national football team at Antwerp, winning 5–0. Robert De Veen scored a hat-trick in the second half.
 27 May – Partial legislative election
 6 July – Belgium a signatory to the Geneva Convention of 1906.
 15 to 19 August – Seventeenth International Eucharistic Congress held in Tournai.
 28 October – Union Minière du Haut Katanga incorporated

Publications

Periodicals
 La Belgique Artistique et Littéraire, vols. 2 (January–March), 3 (April–June), 4 (July–September), 5 (October–December).

Books
 Félicien Cattier, Étude sur la situation de l'État indépendant du Congo
 Ernest Gilliat-Smith, The Story of Brussels, illustrated by Katharine Kimball and Guy Gilliat-Smith (London, J.M. Dent)
 Karl Hanquet (ed.), La Chronique de Saint-Hubert dite Cantatorium (Brussels, Hayez, Imprimeur de L'Academie)
 E. D. Morel, Red Rubber (New York)
 Max Rooses, Jordaens' leven en werken
 Joseph Van den Gheyn, Catalogue des manuscrits de la Bibliothèque royale de Belgique . Tome sixième: Histoire des ordres religieux et des églises particulières (Brussels, Henri Lamertin), vol. 6 of the catalogue of manuscripts of the Royal Library of Belgium.
 Emile Vandervelde, Le Socialisme et l'agriculture (1906)
 Émile Verhaeren, Les heures d'après-midi (Brussels, Edmond Deman)

Art and architecture

 12th Brussels Salon of the Société Royale des Beaux-arts

Paintings
 Théo van Rysselberghe, The Scarlet Ribbon

Buildings
 Royal Galleries of Ostend completed

Births
 5 January – Mark Severin, graphic designer (died 1987)
 25 January – Eddy Blondeel, SAS commander (died 2000)
 14 February – Felix Meskens, athlete (died 1973)
 18 February – Placide Tempels, missionary (died 1977)
 22 March – Marcel Hastir, artist (died 2011)
 8 June – Charles Janssens, actor (died 1986)
 15 June – Léon Degrelle, fascist (died 1994)
 3 July – Fernand Dehousse, politician (died 1976)
 29 July – Alice Roberts, actress (died 1985)
 4 August – Marie José of Belgium, Queen of Italy (died 2001) 
 5 August – Francis Walder, writer and soldier (died 1997)
 8 August – André Demedts, educator (died 1992)
 15 September – Charles of Limburg Stirum, courtier (died 1989)
 25 September – Madeleine Bourdouxhe, author (died 1996)
 22 November – Rita Lejeune, medievalist (died 2009)

Deaths

 25 January – Pierre-Lambert Goossens (born 1827), Archbishop of Mechelen
 25 February – Jean Baptiste Abbeloos (born 1836), orientalist 
 April – Victor Warot (born 1834), opera singer
 May – Jan-Baptist Huysmans (born 1826), painter
 24 April – Georges Montefiore-Levi (born 1832), industrialist 
 24 August – Alfred Stevens (born 1823), painter
 23 September – Jan Van Rijswijck (born 1853), politician
 26 September – Paul Splingaerd (born 1842), mandarin
 27 September – Felix Leopold Oswald (born 1845), science populariser
 9 November – Léon Vanderkindere (born 1842), historian
 30 December – Eugène Goossens, père (born 1845), conductor
 31 December – Hippolyte Lippens (born 1847), industrialist

References

 
1900s in Belgium
Belgium
Belgium
Years of the 20th century in Belgium